Amedeo Bottaro (born 1 May 1971) is an Italian politician.

Biography
Bottaro was born in Naples on 1 May 1971. He graduated at the University of Bari in 1996, and opened his own law firm in the city of Trani, Apulia, in 2009. He is a member of the Democratic Party and was elected Mayor of Trani at the 2015 Italian local elections. He took office on 19 June 2015.

He was re-elected for a second term at the 2020 Italian local elections.

See also
2015 Italian local elections
2020 Italian local elections
List of mayors of Trani

References

External links
 
 

1971 births
Living people
Mayors of places in Apulia
People from Trani
Democratic Party (Italy) politicians